Paolo Cimini (born 30 March 1964) was a former Italian professional cyclist. He is most known for winning one stage in the 1987 Giro d'Italia.

References

Italian male cyclists
Living people
1964 births
Cyclists from Rome